Salvia vaseyi, the scallop-leaf sage, bristle sage or wand sage, is a perennial native to the western Colorado Desert. Flowers grow in compact clusters on  spikes. The  flowers are white, with whitish bracts, calyx, and leaves, blooming from April to June. The specific epithet was named after botanist George Vasey or for his son, George Richard Vasey, who collected the type specimen.

References

External links
USDA Plants Profile
Jepson manual
Photo gallery

vaseyi
Flora of California
Flora without expected TNC conservation status